Flying Tiger Copenhagen (formerly Tiger Copenhagen) is a Danish variety store chain. Its first shop opened in Copenhagen in 1995 and the chain now has nearly 1000 shops. Its largest markets are Denmark, the UK, Italy, and Spain. Before June 2016, it operated as Tiger in most places, T·G·R in Sweden and Norway and Flying Tiger in Ireland, Japan, Belgium, and the Netherlands. The chain sells a variety of items, mostly accessories and toys. According to the company's founder, the company had about 39 million customers in 2014. Tiger takes its name from how the Danish pronunciation of the animal name  sounds roughly the same as the Danish word , used to denote a 10 kroner coin; in the first stores in Denmark, all items cost 10 kroner.

History

Lennart Lajboschitz opened the first shop at Islands Brygge in Copenhagen in 1995.

In 2005, the company opened its first shop in the United Kingdom in Basingstoke.

In 2012, EQT Partners acquired a 70% stake in the chain Tiger via its investment in its parent company Zebra A/S.

In January 2015, the company appointed former The Body Shop director Xavier Vidal as its new chief executive officer. The company opened its first store in the United States in New York City in May 2015,  a 5.000-square-foot/152 mq store in Manhattan's Flatiron District. The company also plan to open seven new locations in the United Kingdom during 2015.

In November 2018, the company announced the opening of four shops in Massachusetts and planned to open 20 more locations in New England in the next few years. The CEO, Mette Maix said the format of the shop is "like a treasure hunt" by adding at least 300 random, new items each month to the shop selection.

In November 2020, Flying Tiger closed all US Stores, to focus on other markets.

Online shopping 
Flying Tiger opened their global online shop in July 2021, catering to most of Europe. The online store ships to Belgium, Denmark, Estonia, Finland, France, Greece, Italy. Ireland, Lithuania, Netherlands, Norway, Portugal, Poland, Czechia, Germany, Hungary, Austria, Slovakia, Spain, Sweden and the UK.

The online store is opening the range of product for a much broader audience than the network of physical stores are catering to.

New products are added to the store each week. Many products are limited edition and only for sale for a limited time.

Number of shops per country

Flying Tiger operates almost 1,000 shops worldwide, of which 937 are in Europe.

Awards and recognition
In 2014, Tiger Stores Ireland won Company of the Year and Best Small Company at the Retail Excellence Ireland awards. In the same year, the company received "Good design" award by Chicago Athenaeum.

References

External links

Retail companies of Denmark
Retail companies based in Copenhagen
Retail companies established in 2000
Danish companies established in 2000
Variety stores
Danish brands
Companies based in Copenhagen Municipality